Van Derheyden House is a historic home located at Delmar in Albany County, New York.  It was built in three phases.  The original dwelling was constructed in 1804 as a "half house," expanded to the present five-bay form in the 1820s, and a large 2-story Greek Revival style rear addition was built in the 1850s.  The main block is a -story center hall plan, Federal-style dwelling.

It was listed on the National Register of Historic Places in 2001.

References

Houses on the National Register of Historic Places in New York (state)
Greek Revival houses in New York (state)
Federal architecture in New York (state)
Houses completed in 1804
Houses in Albany County, New York
National Register of Historic Places in Albany County, New York
1804 establishments in New York (state)